Newcastle KB United, an association football club based in Newcastle, was founded in 1977. They were admitted into the National Soccer League for the 1978 season. They dissolved in 1984 and effectively left the 1984 National Soccer League after seven rounds and was replaced by Newcastle Rosebud United.

Craig Mason held the record for the greatest number of appearances for Newcastle KB United. The English midfielder played 152 times for the club. The club's goalscoring record was held by Ken Boden who scored 30 goals.

Key
 The list is ordered first by date of debut, and then if necessary in alphabetical order.
 Appearances as a substitute are included.

Players

References
General
 

Specific

Newcastle KB United players
Newcastle KB United
Association football player non-biographical articles